Rebecca Levene is a British author and editor. She is the author of The Hollow Gods fantasy novel series. In the 1990s, she was an editor at Virgin Books, including notably of the New Adventures series.

Biography

Levene had a sitcom optioned, but never produced by the BBC.

Her first novel, Where Angels Fear, was co-written with Simon Winstone, her deputy and successor on the New Adventures. More recently, she has written for publisher Black Flame, including a Strontium Dog novel Bad Timing and a Final Destination novel End of the Line.

In 2014, she published Smiler's Fair, the first in a fantasy series The Hollow Gods published by Hodder & Stoughton. The second novel in the series The Hunter's Kind was published in July 2015, followed by The Sun's Domain.

She worked on the storyline and script for the Zombies, Run! smart phone app.

Bibliography
Books authored include:

 Bernice Summerfield New Adventures
 Where Angels Fear, with Simon Winstone
 Black Flame:
 2000 AD:
 Strontium Dog: Bad Timing (June 2004)
 Rogue Trooper: The Quartz Massacre (January 2006)
 Final Destination:
End of the Line (June 2005 )
 Abaddon Books:
 The Afterblight Chronicles: Kill or Cure (April 2007)
 Tomes of the Dead: Anno Mortis (November 2008)
 The Infernal Game: Cold Warriors (February 2010)
 The Infernal Game: Ghost Dance (July 2010)
 Hodder & Stoughton:
 The Hollow Gods series (3 so far):
 Smiler's Fair (July 2014)
 The Hunter's Kind (July 2015)
 The Sun's Devices (October 2020)
Poker for Beginners (2006)
With Magnus Anderson, Grand Thieves & Tomb Raiders (2012)

References

External links
Author profile at Abaddon Books

British science fiction writers
British television writers
Women science fiction and fantasy writers
Year of birth missing (living people)
Living people
British women novelists
21st-century British novelists
21st-century British women writers
British women television writers
21st-century British screenwriters